Flambeau River State Forest is a 90,147 acre (364 km²) unit of the Wisconsin state park system. The forest is composed of northern hardwoods. In 1973, Flambeau River Hemlock-Hardwood Forest was designated as a National Natural Landmark by the National Park Service.

External links
Flambeau River State Forest official site

References

Protected areas of Price County, Wisconsin
Protected areas of Rusk County, Wisconsin
Protected areas of Sawyer County, Wisconsin
Wisconsin state forests
Protected areas established in 1930
1930 establishments in Wisconsin
National Natural Landmarks in Wisconsin